The Devon Football League is a football competition based in England. It consists of 32 clubs, split into two divisions, North & East and South & West. The league sits at step 7 of the National League System, or level 11 of the football pyramid.

History
The league was established in 2019 as part of restructuring of football in the south-west of England, which saw the South West Peninsula League lose its second tier.

Member clubs 2022–23

North & East Division
Appledore
Barnstaple Town Reserves
Beer Albion
Braunton
Budleigh Salterton
Feniton
Fremington
Newtown
North Molton SC
Ottery St Mary
Thorverton
Topsham Town
University of Exeter

South & West Division
Bere Alston United
Buckland Athletic Reserves
DC Auto Repairs
Ipplepen Athletic
Lakeside Athletic
Mount Gould
Newton Abbot Spurs Reserves
Paignton Saints
Plympton Athletic
Plymstock United
Stoke Gabriel & Torbay Police
The Windmill

Champions

References

 
2019 establishments in England
Football in Devon
Football leagues in England
Sports leagues established in 2019